Spiral Farm is a 2019 American drama film directed by Alec Tibaldi, starring Piper De Palma, Amanda Plummer, Cosimo Fusco and Jade Fusco.

Cast
 Piper De Palma as Anahita
 Amanda Plummer as Dianic
 Cosimo Fusco as Maurizio
 Teo Halm as Theo
 Jade Fusco as Dianic
 Sara Anne as Miracle
 Landen Beattie as Ocean

Release
The film premiered at the Slamdance Film Festival on 26 January 2019. and had its European Premiere at the Taormina Film Fest in July 2019 where it won the Best First Film Award. Indican Pictures acquired the film and released it select theaters and VOD on December 13, 2019.

Reception
Paul Parcellin of Film Threat gave the film a score of 8/10. Makenna Sutter-Robinson of SLUG Magazine wrote that the film "has the ability to haunt you with its relevance and leave you in amazement with its nuanced imagery and simple, unexpected beauty."

Noel Murray of the Los Angeles Times wrote that "Not much happens in “Spiral Farm,” but what does is often heartbreaking."

References

External links
 
 

American drama films
2019 drama films